Gonodiscus is a genus of moths of the family Crambidae. It contains only one species, Gonodiscus amplalis, which is found in Chile.

References

Glaphyriinae
Taxa named by William Warren (entomologist)
Crambidae genera
Monotypic moth genera
Endemic fauna of Chile